Nazura Ngahat is a Malaysian international lawn bowler.

Bowls career
Ngahat has represented Malaysia at the Commonwealth Games, in the pairs events at the 2002 Commonwealth Games.

She won four medals at the Asia Pacific Bowls Championships including a gold medal in the 2003 pairs with Siti Zalina Ahmad, in Brisbane and in 2001, she won the gold medal in the fours event event at the 2001 Southeast Asian Games in Kuala Lumpur.

References

Malaysian female bowls players
Living people
Bowls players at the 2002 Commonwealth Games
Year of birth missing (living people)
Southeast Asian Games medalists in lawn bowls
Competitors at the 2001 Southeast Asian Games
Southeast Asian Games gold medalists for Malaysia
21st-century Malaysian women